Hydrotaea armipes is a species of house flies, etc. in the family Muscidae. It is found in Europe.

References

Muscidae
Muscomorph flies of Europe
Insects described in 1825
Taxa named by Carl Fredrik Fallén
Articles created by Qbugbot